Kevin Macdonald (born 28 October 1967) is a Scottish director. His films include  One Day in September (1999), a documentary about the 1972 murder of 11 Israeli athletes, which won him the Academy Award for Best Documentary Feature, the climbing documentary Touching the Void (2003), the drama The Last King of Scotland (2006), the political thriller State of Play (2009), the Bob Marley documentary Marley (2012), the post-apocalyptic drama How I Live Now (2013), the thriller Black Sea (2014), the Whitney Houston documentary Whitney (2018), and the legal drama film The Mauritanian (2021).

Personal life
Macdonald was born in Glasgow, Scotland. His maternal grandparents were the Hungarian-born British Jewish filmmaker Emeric Pressburger and English screenwriter and actress Wendy Orme. He was brought up in Gartocharn, Dunbartonshire and attended the local primary school for the first five years of his education, He was educated at Glenalmond College, and St Anne's College, Oxford. His brother Andrew Macdonald is a film producer.

In 1999, he married Tatiana Lund, with whom he has three sons. He lives in North London.

Career
Macdonald began his career with a biography of his grandfather, The Life and Death of a Screenwriter (1994), which he turned into the documentary The Making of an Englishman (1995).

After making a series of biographical documentaries, Macdonald directed One Day in September (1999), about the murder of Israeli athletes at the 1972 Munich Olympics. Possibly the most striking feature of this film was the lengthy interview with Jamal Al-Gashey, the last known survivor of the Munich terrorists (it has been suggested recently in Aaron Klein's book Striking Back that another, Mohammed Safady, might also still be alive).  Macdonald found Al-Gashey through intermediaries, and was able to convince him that the film would only be truly authentic if Al-Gashey gave his side of the story. Since the former terrorist was convinced that Israeli authorities were still hunting him (he had been in hiding ever since being ransomed for a hijacked aeroplane less than two months after the Munich massacre), Al-Gashey agreed to the interview only on condition that he would be disguised, his face would be shown only in shadow or blurred out, and that the interview would be conducted by a person and in a place of Al-Gashey's choosing (which turned out to be Amman, Jordan), although Al-Gashey agreed that Macdonald could be present. Since the interview was conducted entirely in Arabic (even though Al-Gashey was known to be fluent in English, having been interviewed in the language in 1972), and Al-Gashey (through paranoia or annoyance) frequently stormed out of the interview room, Macdonald did not know if he had anything usable until he returned to London and hired an Arabic translator. The film won an Oscar for Best Documentary.

His next film was Touching the Void, a docudrama that told the story of two climbers making the first successful ascent of the West Face of Siula Grande, a major peak in the Peruvian Andes, in 1985 and the subsequent dramatic series of events during their descent after one of the climbers broke his leg whilst high on the peak. The film won the Alexander Korda Award for Best British Film at the 2003–04 BAFTA Awards – coincidentally, it was Korda who had given Macdonald's grandfather his first job when he had arrived in Britain in 1935.

Next was The Last King of Scotland, for which Forest Whitaker received widespread acclaim and won multiple acting awards including Academy Award for Best Actor.

He has also directed a number of television commercials with Rogue Films who represent him for all his TV commercial work worldwide.

Macdonald directed the film adaptation of hit BBC television drama State of Play, starring Russell Crowe. He then directed The Eagle, an adaptation of the book The Eagle of the Ninth, about a Roman Legion in 2nd century A.D. in Scotland. Bobby Fischer Goes to War, his next project, is a film about the 1972 World Chess Championship in Reykjavík, Iceland, in which Bobby Fischer took on the entire Soviet chess establishment.

Macdonald made the film Life in a Day with producer Ridley Scott. The footage was filmed by thousands of people all around the world about their life in one day and posted on YouTube. The film premiered at the 2011 Sundance Film Festival to a global live audience, on 27 January 2011.

Macdonald worked with the film production team Altitude, who created the commercially and critically acclaimed Amy Winehouse documentary film Amy (2015), on Whitney, a 2018 documentary based on Whitney Houston's life and death. This was the first Whitney Houston documentary to be officially authorized by the estate, and includes never-before-seen footage of Houston, exclusive demo recordings, rare performances and interviews with luminaries like Clive Davis. Macdonald stated, "The story that is never told about Whitney is just how brilliant she was as an artist; by many measures she had the greatest voice of the last 50 years. She changed the way pop music was sung - bringing it back full circle to its blues and gospel roots. She was also completely unique in being a black pop star who transcended her race globally with her work sold in countries where black artists don't sell."

In 2021, Macdonald released The Mauritanian, a legal drama based on the true story of Mohamedou Ould Slahi, a Mauritanian man who was held for fourteen years (from 2002 to 2016) without charge in the Guantanamo Bay detention camp, a United States military prison. The film received mixed to positive reviews, with critics praising Macdonald's direction, its cinematography and performances of the cast but criticised its screenplay. At the 78th Golden Globe Awards the film received two nominations; Best Actor – Motion Picture Drama (for Rahim), with Foster winning Best Supporting Actress – Motion Picture. At the 74th British Academy Film Awards the film received five nominations, including Best Film.

Filmography
As director:
 The Making of an Englishman (1995), about the filmmaker Emeric Pressburger
 Chaplin's Goliath (1996), about the actor Eric Campbell
 The Moving World of George Rickey (1997)
 Howard Hawks: American Artist (1997)
 Donald Cammell: The Ultimate Performance (1998, also producer), about the film director Donald Cammell
 One Day in September (1999) (won an Academy Award)
 Humphrey Jennings (2000)
 A Brief History of Errol Morris (2000), interview with Errol Morris
 Being Mick (2001), a fly-on-the-wall documentary following Mick Jagger
 Touching the Void (2003)
 The Last King of Scotland (2006)
 My Enemy's Enemy (2007)
 State of Play (2009)
 The Eagle (2011)
 Life in a Day (2011)
 Marley (2012)
 How I Live Now (2013)
 Black Sea (2014)
 11.22.63  (2016) (episode 1, "The Rabbit Hole")
 Sky Ladder - The Art of Cai Guo-Qiang (2016)
 Oasis (2017) (originally intended as a TV series pilot)
 Whitney (2018)
 Life in a Day 2020 (2021)
 The Mauritanian (2021)
 It Takes A Flood… (2021)

Bibliography
 Emeric Pressburger: The Life and Death of a Screenwriter by Kevin Macdonald. London: Faber and Faber, 1994. ISBN  (Paperback ).
 Imagining Reality: The Faber Book of the Documentary by Kevin Macdonald and Mark Cousins. London: Faber and Faber, 1996. .
 Imagining Reality: The Faber Book of the Documentary: Second Edition by Kevin Macdonald and Mark Cousins. London: Faber and Faber, 1996. .

References

Further reading
Ian Aitken (ed) Encyclopedia of the Documentary Film, Routledge, 2005

External links
 
 
 An interview with Macdonald on the making of Touching the Void
 An interview with Macdonald on making The Last King of Scotland
 Davy Rothbart Interviews Kevin Macdonald for Grantland
 Television commercials
 Kevin Macdonald's Commercial Work (US)

1967 births
British documentary film directors
Living people
Mountaineering film directors
Film people from Glasgow
Alumni of St Anne's College, Oxford
Scottish people of English descent
British people of Hungarian-Jewish descent
Scottish people of Hungarian descent
Scottish people of Jewish descent
Scottish documentary filmmakers
Scottish film directors
People educated at Glenalmond College
Directors of Best Documentary Feature Academy Award winners
English-language film directors